Elections to the Assam Legislative Assembly were held in April 1996 to elect members of 114 constituencies in Assam, India. The Indian National Congress (INC) won the popular vote, but the Asom Gana Parishad (AGP) won the most seats and Prafulla Kumar Mahanta was appointed as the Chief Minister of Assam for his second term.  The number of constituencies was set as 126, by the recommendation of the Delimitation Commission of India, but elections were held in only 122 constituencies. The constituencies of Dispur, Dergaon, Nazira and Margherita did not go to polls immediately, but they had polls in November 1996.

Background
The Chief Minister of Assam, Hiteswar Saikia, died in Delhi, on 22 April 1996, just 5 days before the election. Bhumidhar Barman was sworn in as chief-minister, but since the INC wasn't able to form the government after the election, his tenure was just 22 days.

In 1993, the breakaway group of the AGP, the Natun Asom Gana Parishad, merged back with the AGP. Additionally, the AGP formed a five-party alliance before the elections, with the CPI, the CPI(M), the ASDC and the UMFA.

Result

Elected members

Aftermath
On 6 May 1996, the Minister for Rural Development, and candidate for the Golaghat Assembly constituency, Nagen Neog was killed, by suspected terrorists. Along with him, 8 other people, including his driver, and 5 bodyguards, also died.

Bye-elections

See also
List of constituencies of the Assam Legislative Assembly
1996 elections in India

References

Assam
State Assembly elections in Assam
1990s in Assam